"The Lights of Zetar" is the eighteenth episode of the third season of the American science fiction television series  Star Trek. Written by Jeremy Tarcher and his wife Shari Lewis and directed by Herb Kenwith, it was first broadcast on January 31, 1969.

In the episode, strange incorporeal aliens threaten the Memory Alpha station and the Enterprise.

Plot
The Federation starship  Enterprise is en route to Memory Alpha, a planetoid that is home to the Federation's central library. A storm-like phenomenon moving at warp speed is also on course to the planetoid. The Enterprise intercepts the storm, which enters the ship, affecting some crew members' nervous systems. Lieutenant Mira Romaine, who has been assigned to Memory Alpha, faints from the effects of the storm. Chief Medical Officer Dr. McCoy examines Romaine, who seems unresponsive apart from strange grunting sounds.

The storm proceeds to Memory Alpha, with the Enterprise in pursuit, and destroys the station's computer core. Captain Kirk, along with Science Officer Spock, Dr. McCoy, and Mr. Scott beam to the station to inspect the damage. Meanwhile, Romaine has visions of corpses at Memory Alpha. The landing party finds the Memory Alpha's archives seriously damaged, and its staff dead, save one who makes the same guttural noises as Romaine, and dies from what McCoy determines to be a brain hemorrhage. Kirk then has Romaine beamed to the station. She is terrified to see the exact scene from her vision, and then warns that the storm is returning.

Scans of the storm determine that it is actually a group of life forms, and Kirk tries to communicate with them through the universal translator, but gets no response. After firing phaser warning shots, Kirk resorts to a full attack, and as the beams strike the storm, Romaine seems to react in pain. Scott, noticing this, begs Kirk to stop the attack.

During a discussion in the briefing room, McCoy reports that Romaine's brain wave pattern has been altered, and Spock reveals that the new pattern matches sensor data from the storm. They conclude that the alien life forms are attempting to take control of Romaine's body. To prevent this, they devise a plan to allow the aliens to take partial control and then subject Romaine to high atmospheric pressure. Before they can place her into the pressure chamber, the aliens finally enter Romaine's body, and begin to speak through her, identifying themselves as survivors from the long-dead planet of Zetar. They intend to live out their remaining existence using Romaine's body. With some difficulty, Scott succeeds in getting Romaine into the pressure chamber, and the aliens are eventually driven out and apparently destroyed.

With the conclusion of the crisis, Spock, McCoy, and Scott all agree that Romaine is fit to return to duty, with a new assignment to oversee salvaging and repairs of Memory Alpha's archives.

Production and reception
Episode co-writer Shari Lewis was best known as a children's entertainer, being the original puppeteer of the sock puppet, Lamb Chop. She was married at the time to the episode's other credited writer, Jeremy Tarcher.

Sequel novel
In the non-canon novel, Memory Prime, Romaine participates in a project to rebuild the archives in a more secure structure.  The project is soon thrown into turmoil by a murder plot that escalates into a looming crisis that threatens to repeat Memory Alpha's disaster.  However, with the aid of the crew of the USS Enterprise, Romaine manages to avert it.

Popular culture
Memory Alpha, the wiki devoted to the Star Trek franchise, was named after the planetoid in this episode.

Home video releases 
This episode was released in Japan on December 21, 1993 as part of the complete season 3 LaserDisc set, Star Trek: Original Series log.3. A trailer for this and the other episodes was also included, and the episode had English and Japanese audio tracks. The cover script was スター・トレック TVサードシーズン 

This episode was included in TOS Season 3 remastered DVD box set, with the remastered version of this episode.

References

External links

"The Lights of Zetar" Startrek.com archive link.

"The Lights of Zetar" Review of the remastered version at TrekMovie.com

Star Trek: The Original Series (season 3) episodes
1969 American television episodes